The 1993 Supertaça Cândido de Oliveira was the 15th edition of the Supertaça Cândido de Oliveira, the annual Portuguese football season-opening match contested by the winners of the previous season's top league and cup competitions (or cup runner-up in case the league- and cup-winning club is the same). The 1993 Supertaça Cândido de Oliveira was contested over two legs, and opposed Benfica and Porto of the Primeira Liga. Porto qualified for the SuperCup by winning the 1992–93 Primeira Divisão, whilst Benfica qualified for the Supertaça by winning the 1992–93 Taça de Portugal.

The first leg which took place at the Estádio da Luz, saw Benfica defeat Porto 1–0 as a result of a late Rui Águas goal. The second leg which took place at the Estádio das Antas saw Porto defeat Benfica 1–0 (1–1 on aggregate), which led to the Supertaça being replayed in August 1994. The replay which took place at Estádio Municipal de Coimbra, saw the Dragões defeat the Encarnados 4–3 on penalties which would claim the Portistas a seventh Supertaça.

First leg

Details

Second leg

Details

Replay

Details

References

Supertaça Cândido de Oliveira
1993–94 in Portuguese football
S.L. Benfica matches
FC Porto matches
Association football penalty shoot-outs